Francis Xavier Alexander Shields Sr. (November 18, 1909 – August 19, 1975) was an American amateur tennis player of the 1920s and 1930s, and an actor known for Hoosier Schoolboy (1937).

Tennis career
Between 1928 and 1945 he was ranked eight times in the U.S. Top Ten, reaching No. 1 in 1933, and No. 2 in 1930. He was ranked world No. 5 in 1930 by A. Wallis Myers of The Daily Telegraph. Shields beat Wilmer Allison and Sidney Wood before losing to John Doeg in the final of the 1930 U.S. Championships. Shields defaulted to Sidney Wood in the singles final of Wimbledon in 1931 due to an ankle injury he had sustained in winning his semi-final match against France's "Musketeer" Jean Borotra, and this was the only time in the history of a Grand Slam event the singles final of that event was won by default.

He entered the 1950 US Open. However, he and Ginger Rogers were knocked out of the mixed doubles competition in the first round. He competed at the 1951 U.S. Open in New York City, and in Round 1 was defeated by South African Syd Levy in straight sets.

Davis Cup
He competed for the Davis Cup in 1931, 1932, and 1934, winning 19 of 25 matches.  He was left off the team for his erratic playing in 1933. Shields was the non-playing captain in 1951, when the team won four matches.

Shields had his issues both with interactions with other players, and with alcohol.  In the late 1930s, Shields was known for making fun of the US tennis star Bryan Grant, the smallest American to win an international championship, saying "the little shaver" was hiding behind the net.  Once a drunk Shields held Grant upside down, outside a hotel window.

Grand Slam finals

Singles (2 runners-up)

Doubles (1 runner-up)

Mixed doubles (1 runner-up)

Marriages
In 1932, Shields married Rebecca Tenney (1910–2005). In 1938 he maintained a home in Palm Springs, California. Shields and Tenney divorced in 1940 on the grounds of his "habitual intemperance and cruelty" and in 1947 she married lawyer Donald Agnew.

In 1940, he married his second wife, Marina Torlonia di Civitella-Cesi (1916–1960). Marina was the daughter of Marino Torlonia, 4th prince of Civitella-Cesi (1861–1933) and Mary Elsie Moore (1888–1941), an American heiress.  Marina's brother was Alessandro Torlonia, 5th Prince di Civitella-Cesi (1911–1986), the husband of the Spanish Infanta Beatriz de Borbón (1909–2002).  Shields had two children with Marina Torlonia:
 Francis Xavier Alexander, Jr. (1941–2003), the father of actress-model Brooke Shields (b. 1965)
 Cristiana Marina Shields (b. 1943)
Shields and Torlonia divorced and in 1950 she married Edward W. Slater.

In 1949, he married Katharine Mortimer (1923–2003), the daughter of financier Stanley Grafton Mortimer, Sr. She had previously been married to Oliver Cadwell Biddle, with whom she had a daughter, Christine Mortimer Biddle, who became a stepdaughter to Shields. Shields had three children with Mortimer:
 Katharine Shields
 William "Willy" Xavier Orin Hunt Shields (1949–2016)
 Alston Shields.
Shields and Mortimer divorced and in 1962 she married Richard Gillespie Blaine.

Later life
In his later years he was frequently drunk, at which times he became destructive and bullying with his strength.   After two heart attacks and a stroke, he died at 65 of a third heart attack, in a Manhattan taxi. He was the grandfather of Brooke Shields, Morgan Christina Shields, and Holton Joseph Shields.

Acting career
Shields appeared in the following films:
 
 Murder in the Fleet – 1935 as Lieutenant Arnold
 I Live My Life – 1935 as outer office secretary
 Come and Get It – 1936 – as Tony Schwerke
 Affairs of Cappy Ricks – 1937 – as Waldo Bottomley, Jr.
 Hoosier Schoolboy – 1937 – as Jack Matthews. Jr.
 Dead End – 1937 – as well-dressed man
 The Goldwyn Follies – 1938 – as assistant director

International Tennis Hall of Fame
Shields was inducted into the International Tennis Hall of Fame in Newport, Rhode Island in 1964.

Career highlights
 
 Cincinnati Singles Champion, 1930
 US Open Singles finalist, 1930
 US Open Mixed doubles finalist, 1930
 Wimbledon Singles finalist, 1931
 US Open Doubles finalist, 1933
 United States Davis Cup team member 1931–32, 1934

References

External links
 
 
 
 

1909 births
1975 deaths
American male film actors
American male tennis players
Mortimer family of New York
Sportspeople from New York City
Sportspeople from Palm Springs, California
International Tennis Hall of Fame inductees
Tennis people from New York (state)
Male actors from New York City
20th-century American male actors